Nelk (stylized as NELK), also referred to as the Nelk Boys, is a Canadian-American YouTube channel and entertainment company.

They are known for their prank videos, vlogs, and their brand Full Send Entertainment. The group's founder, Kyle Forgeard, and Jesse Sebastiani, have been referred to as "two of the most recognizable personalities for young people in North America".

Content and brand
Nelk's videos, in addition to pranks, are themed around North American college culture. The group's videos combine vlogs of their party lifestyle with footage of their actual pranks.

Nelk is known for popularizing and later trademarking the slang term "Full Send" (stylized as FULL SEND) which Forgeard defined as meaning "any activity you do, give it your absolute best". The group has also popularized a number of other terms, including "Rona Season," a reference to the group's constant consumption of Corona beer. Sebastiani has referred to the group's trademark words as "Canadian-influenced slang".

Nelk operates the Full Send clothing brand. The clothing is sold in one-time Supreme-style "drops", where each style of clothing has limited availability and is only available once. Once the entire drop is sold out, no Full Send clothing can be purchased until the next drop, when new styles will become available. Nelk sells almost $100 million worth of apparel every year.

Nelk owns a hard seltzer brand called Happy Dad.

The group hosts a podcast called the Full Send Podcast. Most episodes have featured a guest. Many notable guests have been on the podcast including Donald Trump, Mike Tyson, Elon Musk, Andrew Tate, OJ Simpson, Ben Shapiro and others. The podcast was created in partnership with Shots Podcast Network.

Subsidiaries

YouTube Channels

Rumble Channels

Most Viewed Podcasts

Members 
Current and recurring members include Kyle Forgeard, Stephen “SteveWillDoIt” Deleonardis, Salim Sirur, Gabriel Poncio, Aaron "Steiny" Steinberg, "Jimmy Gambles" (Arthur Kulik), and "Cousin Jay" (Jordan Nwanne). Canadian filmmaker Austin Ermes is Nelk’s Director of Content. Nelk Headquarters is located in Newport Beach, California. Nelk also has an offshoot location in Miami, Florida under SteveWillDoIt LLC. The group previously resided in Ontario, Canada, and Los Angeles.

Jesse Sebastiani was a founding member of the group. Prior to joining Nelk, was known for his self-published documentary, Saved by the Status, and his role in the MTV show Careless Teens. Years after joining, he expressed his displeasure with his and the group's lifestyle. In a tweet posted on January 29, 2020, he wrote, "I hate fame... I've lost almost everything I use to love about life". He eventually became less active in Nelk videos, and in late 2020, he began primarily working on the Full Send brand. In 2022, he officially took distance from the group, bought out of the company, and started his own brand called “Sunday”.

Other former members of the group include Niko and Marko Martinovic, Lucas Gasparini, and Jason Pagaduan. Niko and Marko, who are twins, were members of Nelk in the early development, but left in 2015 to pursue YouTube independently. Gasparini left in 2017 citing concerns of his association with the channel's content, which consisted of public misconduct which would affect his career outlook, as well as the pursuit of educational studies as a plumber. He then returned in 2021 joining the rest of the team in Los Angeles. Pagaduan, who was known by his Instagram handle "905shooter" or simply "9-0," was withdrawn from the group in October 2019 for behavioral misconduct from sexual harassment allegations stemming from Pagaduan sending direct messages of a graphic and sexual nature to fans, as well as not meeting standards.

Nelk Boys

Crew

Former

Corporate

Full Send Podcast

Dream Squad

Full Send MMA

History 
In 2010, Forgeard created the YouTube channel, at the time called NelkFilmz, along with other founding members Niko and Marko Martinovic, and Lucas Gasparini. In 2014, Forgeard met Jesse Sebastiani at an MTV Canada conference, who would soon after become a prominent member of the group.

In January 2015, Nelk posted a video titled "Coke Prank On Cops" in which they told police officers in Los Angeles that they had "coke" in the back of the car, leading the officers to think that they were referring to cocaine when in reality they were referring to Coca-Cola. In May 2016, the video became a subject of controversy. The group received a warning, and the Los Angeles Police Department released a statement informing the public that the prank was illegal and warning potential copycat pranksters against doing so. The video has received 49 million views and is currently their most viewed, having almost three times as many views as their second-most viewed video.

In June 2017, it was announced that Gasparini had left because he no longer wanted to pursue Nelk as a full-time career. He re-joined later in 2021.

In January 2019, Sebastiani was arrested during a prank in which he walked into a Barnes & Noble store with fake blood smeared on a white jumpsuit and asked workers for books on covering up a crime scene. He was charged by Columbus, Ohio police department, and found guilty of disorderly conduct in the Ohio Court of Common Pleas.

In May 2019, Stephen Deleonardis joined Nelk after being discovered by Forgeard for his drinking and smoking challenge videos.

In August 2019, Nelk participated in a "spin the globe challenge", and ended up in Europe. In Ireland, Nelk planned a meetup in a public park, but failed to notify the local police. The meetup got out of control, with large mobs of fans swarming the area in an unsafe manner, causing the meetup to be cut short. Afterward, Jason Pagaduan was removed from the group. In February 2020, Nelk moved into a residence in Los Angeles, California which they refer to as the "Full Send House". Salim Sirur and Cousin Jay also joined Nelk at this time.

In May 2020, Forgeard, Deleonardis, Sirur, along with several other members were arrested for disturbing the peace while filming a prank at a Target store in Mississippi. They were later released on bond.

In September 2020, the police department in Normal, Illinois announced an investigation into Nelk after they hosted a flash mob of about 200 people on-campus at Illinois State University in violation of COVID-19 regulations. Following this, YouTube announced a decision to totally demonitize the Nelk YouTube account in addition to most of their specific videos, so that no money could be earned from YouTube. They attributed the decision to the platform's Creator Responsibility Policy, which mandates that creators do not engage in “on- and/or off-platform behavior [that] harms our users, community, employees or ecosystem," claiming that Nelk had harmed YouTube users by hosting a group of people and thereby violating COVID-19 regulations. Chris Koos, the town's mayor, also stated that he intends to pursue legal action against Nelk. A week later, police in Seaside Heights, New Jersey broke up a gathering of about 1,500 people at a house being rented by Nelk, which violated New Jersey's COVID-19 restrictions. Nelk, despite no intentions to draw a crowd, was eventually kicked out of the house by the landlord and 8 fans were arrested. Governor Phil Murphy called the event "knucklehead behavior".

In October 2020, Nelk members Forgeard, Deleonardis, and Sirur traveled overseas to Abu Dhabi. Later the same month, members met with President Donald Trump on Air Force One during one of his 2020 presidential election rallies. They were also seen to dance to the "Y.M.C.A." song with President Trump onstage following his rally. They met Trump again in July 2021 at UFC 264.

On March 23, 2021, Nelk was unable to upload a video due to suggestions by their attorney in relation to an arrest warrant filed against Forgeard in Texas. That same month, CBS reported that Nelk was responsible for a series of physical assaults at a group meet in Fort Worth, Texas on March 15.

On May 31, 2021, Nelk revealed their own brand of hard seltzer called Happy Dad. The beverage became available for purchase on June 14, 2021 in select US states, and is expanding to other locations over time. Happy Dad Seltzer is produced and packaged at Minhas Breweries & Distillery in Monroe, WI.

On September 8, 2021, Nelk uploaded the first episode of their "Full Send Podcast", exclusive to YouTube and Apple Podcasts.

In February 2022, Forgeard was officially added to the Forbes 30 under 30 list for social media influencers. 

On March 9, 2022, Nelk interviewed former President Trump on an episode of the Full Send Podcast. In less than 24 hours, the interview received 5 million views on YouTube, which was soon after removed by YouTube. Within a week, Full Send Podcast became the second most popular podcast in the US on Spotify.

On August 5, 2022, Nelk released an interview with Elon Musk on the Full Send Podcast, which acquired over 2 million views in less than a day.

Awards and nominations

Streamy Awards 
The YouTube Streamy Awards,  or commonly referred to as the Streamy's, are presented annually to recognize and honor excellence in online video, including directing, acting, producing, and writing.

References 

Living people
Canadian YouTubers
American YouTubers
Prank YouTubers
Year of birth missing (living people)
Lifestyle YouTubers
Comedy-related YouTube channels
YouTube controversies
Twitch (service) streamers
YouTube channels launched in 2010
American Internet groups
American YouTube groups
Canadian YouTube groups